For the Senior equivalent see: Connacht Senior Hurling Championship

The Connacht U-21 Hurling Championship is an U-21 hurling tournament. The winners of the Connacht championship go on to qualify for the All-Ireland Under-21 Hurling Championship. The last winners of the Connacht championship was Galway in 2005, there was no competition in 2006 and 2007 therefore Galway went straight to the semi finals of the All-Ireland Under-21 Hurling Championship without playing a game. Galway are the only team to win the Connacht championship and it has only been played on 8 occasions due to a lack of a competitive side to compete with in Connacht.

The competition was resurrected in 2010 as part of the All-Ireland B Under-21 Hurling Championship. The final was won by Roscommon who defeated Mayo 3–10 to 0–10.

Top winners

Sources
 Roll of Honour on gaainfo.com
 Complete Roll of Honour on Kilkenny GAA bible

Connacht GAA inter-county hurling competitions
Conn